Durban, South Africa has a notable number of buildings built in the Art Deco style popularised in the US in the 1930s.  Durban-style Art Deco buildings share the characteristic bold colours, geometric shapes and  glamorous ornamentals of the global style, while incorporating local narratives and motifs.

The styling of Art Deco buildings in Durban reflects the different backgrounds of the city's population. Some buildings, such as Quadrant House on the Victoria Embankment, emphasise the city's maritime background.  Other buildings, such as Ebrahim Court and the Essop Moosa Building, are built in a style reflecting the interests of Durban's Muslim traders in the 1930s.  Some of the buildings pay allegiance to Durban's long association with the British Empire, such as Empire Court and Dominion Court.

Notable examples 

Some notable examples of the Art Deco style in Durban:
 Berea Court (Berea Road West, Berea)
 Colonial Mutual Building (West Street, Durban Central)
 Memorial Tower Building (University of KwaZulu-Natal, Howard College Campus)
 Surrey Mansions (Currie Road, Berea)
Kintyre (Clark Road, Glenwood)
Jubilee Court (Clarence Road, Morningside)
The cenotaph in the central square outside the City Hall is another striking Art Deco construction.

Preservation of buildings 

Due to a number of factors including inner city urban decay, a number of Art Deco style buildings are presently in a state of disrepair.

The Durban Art Deco Society was founded in 2000 in order to raise awareness of the value of Art Deco buildings to the city's architectural heritage.

Gallery

See also
List of Art Deco buildings in Melbourne
List of Art Deco buildings in Tasmania
Napier, New Zealand

References

External links
Durban Deco Directory  
The Durban Art Deco Society  
Art Deco in Ireland  
The Art Deco Trust of Napier, New Zealand

Art Deco
Durban
Culture of Durban
Durban